Trisuloides sericea is a moth of the family Noctuidae. It is found in South-east Asia.

The wingspan is about 24 mm.

Subspecies
Trisuloides sericea sericea (India)
Trisuloides sericea hawkeri A.E. Prout & Talbot, 1924 (Indonesia: Central Buru)
Trisuloides sericea trigonoleuca A.E. Prout, 1922 (Indonesia, Central Sulawesi)

References

 ; ;  2011: A revision of the genus Trisuloides Butler, 1881 with descriptions of three new species from China (Lepidoptera, Noctuidae). Revision of Pantheinae, contribution I. Zootaxa, 3069: 1–25. Preview.

Moths described in 1881
Pantheinae
Moths of Japan